Nameless Glacier  is a glacier that descends westward from Adare Peninsula and discharges into Protection Cove, Robertson Bay, 2 nautical miles (3.7 km) north of Newnes Glacier. It was charted and named by the Northern Party of the British Antarctic Expedition, 1910–13. This was the only one of the Robertson Bay glaciers that was left unnamed by C.E. Borchgrevink, who headed the Southern Cross Expedition, 1898–1900.

References

Glaciers of Pennell Coast